Jackson Kiplagat Kiptanui is a Kenyan politician. He belongs to the United Republican Party and was elected to represent the Keiyo South Constituency in the National Assembly of Kenya since the 2007 Kenyan parliamentary election.
He currently chairs the Board of Directors of Kerio Valley Development Authority- KVDA.
He has vied for Governor and Member of National Assembly in Kenya

References

Living people
Year of birth missing (living people)
Orange Democratic Movement politicians
Members of the National Assembly (Kenya)